The 2021-22 Inverness Caledonian Thistle season is the club's 28th campaign, and their fifth consecutive season in the Championship - the second-tier of Scottish football.

Events

Pre-Season 
1 June 2021: Billy Dodds is named as the team's new manager, resulting in mixed reception from fans.

Fixtures and Results

Friendlies

League

Scottish Premiership play-offs

Scottish Cup

League Cup 
The Group Stage for the cup was drawn on 28 May 2021, with Cove Rangers, Heart of Midlothian, Inverness, Peterhead and Stirling Albion being drawn into Group A. The first match will be played on 13 July 2021.

SPFL Trust Challenge Cup 
Inverness are due to enter the Challenge Cup at Round 2 which will be played on the 4th and 5 September.

North of Scotland Cup 
Did not enter.

Team Statistics

League table

Management Statistics

First Team Player Statistics

League Goalscorers

Overall Goalscorers 

*as of match played 23 May 2022

**players in italics left the club during the season.

Hat-tricks

Transfers 

*at time of transfer/loan

References

Inverness Caledonian Thistle F.C. seasons
Inverness